The Bowman's layer (Bowman's membrane, anterior limiting lamina, anterior elastic lamina) is a smooth, acellular, nonregenerating layer, located between the superficial epithelium and the stroma in the cornea of the eye. It is composed of strong, randomly oriented collagen fibrils in which the smooth anterior surface faces the epithelial basement membrane and the posterior surface merges with the collagen lamellae of the corneal stroma proper.

In adult humans, Bowman's layer is 8-12 μm thick. With ageing, this layer becomes thinner.

The function of the Bowman's layer remains unclear and it appears to have no critical function in corneal physiology. Recently, it is postulated that the layer may act as a physical barrier to protect the subepithelial nerve plexus and thereby  hastens epithelial innervation and sensory recovery. Moreover, it may also serve as a barrier that prevents direct traumatic contact with the corneal stroma and hence it is highly involved in stromal wound healing and the associated restoration of anterior corneal transparency at the morphological level.

Part of the Bowman's layer is ablated by the photorefractive keratectomy refractive surgery (commonly known as PRK). As the layer is non-generative, the section of the layer ablated in the procedure is lost forever.

History 
The Bowman's layer is named after Sir William Bowman (1816–1892), an English physician, anatomist and ophthalmologist, who discovered this structure.  Bowman's layer is not a true basement membrane, despite being originally referred to as such.</ref>

See also
 Refractive surgery
 Descemet's membrane

References

External links
 
 Diagram at sheinman.com
 Diagram at cornea_crosssection_en.jpg

Human eye anatomy

de:Hornhaut#Bowman-Membran